Oil Retort House is a Grade II listed building in Kilve, Somerset, United Kingdom.

History 
In 1924, the Shalime Company was formed to exploit shale oil and blue lias limestone in Kilve, Somerset. A retort was constructed in anticipation of this exploitation. However, financial backing for the project failed to materialise.

Oil Retort House was listed on 16 November 1984.

References 

Grade II listed buildings in West Somerset
1924 establishments in England